Phalauda is a town and a nagar panchayat in Meerut district in the Indian state of Uttar Pradesh.

Geography
It has an average elevation of 221 metres (725 feet).

Demographics
 India census, Phalauda had a population of 17,200. Males constitute 53% of the population and females 47%. Phalauda has an average literacy rate of 49%, lower than the national average of 59.5%: male literacy is 59%, and female literacy is 38%. In Phalauda, 19% of the population is under 6 years of age.

References

Cities and towns in Meerut district